The America Zone was one of the three regional zones of the 1961 Davis Cup.

7 teams entered the America Zone, with the winner going on to compete in the Inter-Zonal Zone against the winners of the Eastern Zone and Europe Zone. The United States defeated Mexico in the final and progressed to the Inter-Zonal Zone.

Draw

Quarterfinals

Canada vs. Mexico

Ecuador vs. Colombia

Caribbean/West Indies vs. United States

Semifinals

Morocco vs. Mexico

United States vs. Ecuador

Final

United States vs. Mexico

References

External links
Davis Cup official website

Davis Cup Americas Zone
America Zone
Davis Cup